Alberto Dalbés (April 3, 1922 – September 14, 1983) was an Argentine film and television actor. who appeared in Argentinian and Spanish films, including horror films, giallo/ crime dramas (Night of the Assassins, A Quiet Place To Kill) and spaghetti westerns (Cut-Throats Nine, 100 Rifles). He was known for his roles in eleven films directed by Jesus Franco including The Devil Came from Akasava (1971), Daughter of Dracula (1972), Tender and Perverse Emanuelle (1973), The Erotic Rites of Frankenstein (1973), Les Demons (1973), Un capitán de quince años (1974), Un Silencio de Tumba (1976), and Dracula, Prisoner of Frankenstein (1972). He also starred in Hunchback of the Morgue (1973) co-starring Paul Naschy and Maniac Mansion (1972). He died in Madrid in 1983, at age 61.

Selected filmography

 La juventud manda (1943)
 Juan Moreira (1948)
 Los secretos del buzón (1948)
 Ellos nos hicieron así (1952)
 La mejor del colegio (1953)
 Una ventana a la vida (1953)
 La voz de mi ciudad/ Voice of the City (1953)
 The Age of Love (1954)
 Más pobre que una laucha / Poorer Than a Mouse(1955)
 Canario rojo (1955)
 Vida nocturna (1955) - (uncredited)
 Rosaura at 10 O'clock (1958) - David Réguel
 El bote, el río y la gente (1960)
 Vacanze in Argentina (1960)
 El amor empieza en sábado (1961)
 Carnival of Crime (1962) - Photographer
 Su alteza la niña (1962) - Archiduque de Pomerania
 Operación Embajada (1963) - Óscar Madroño
 El sol en el espejo (1963) - Julio
 El juego de la verdad (1963) - Pablo
 Los muertos no perdonan (1963) - Antonio León
 Fuera de la ley (1964)
 El salario del crimen (1964) - Hermano de Elsa
 Assassination in Rome (1965)
 That Man in Istanbul (1965) - Thug
 Espionage in Tangier (1965) - Rigo Orie
 Vivir al sol (1965)
 Secuestro en la ciudad (1965) - Ignacio Armengol
 M.M.M. 83 (1966) - Renard
 Fata Morgana (1966) - Álvaro
 Ypotron - Final Countdown (1966) - Revel
 Danger!! Death Ray (1967) - Carver
 Another's Wife (1967) - Santiago
 Amor en el aire (1967) - Pinto Rosado
 Play-Boy (1967)
 Un colpo da mille miliardi (1968)
 Criminal Affair (1968) - Schwartz
 100 Rifles (1969) - Padre Francisco
 Las trompetas del apocalipsis (1969) - Albert Stone
 A Quiet Place to Kill (1970) - Dr. Harry Webb
 Prana (1970) - Julio
 Helena y Fernanda (1970)
 Les belles au bois dormantes (1970) - Philippe
 The Devil Came from Akasava (1971) - Irving Lambert (uncredited)
 La araucana (1971) - Fiscal
 Cut-Throats Nine (1972) - Thomas Lawrence, 'Dandy Tom'
 Maniac Mansion (1972) - aka Murder Mansion directed by Francisco Lara Polop
 Dracula, Prisoner of Frankenstein (1972) - Doctor Jonathan Seward
 Pancho Villa (1972) - Mendoza
 Daughter of Dracula (1972) - Ptuschko / Inspector
 Les démons (1973) - Thomas Renfield
 Hunchback of the Morgue (1973) - Dr. Orla
 The Erotic Rites of Frankenstein (1973) - Doctor Seward
 Tender and Perverse Emanuelle (1973) - Gordon Douglas
 Relax Baby (1973) unfinished film
 El misterio del castillo rojo (1973) unfinished film
 Un capitán de quince años (1974) - Vargas
 Juegos de sociedad (1974) - Roque
 Night of the Assassins (1974) - Major Oliver Brooks
 ¡Ya soy mujer! (1975) - Padre de Ana
 L'uomo che sfidò l'organizzazione (1975) - Harry
 Un silencio de tumba (1976) - Juan Ribas
 Cuando Conchita se escapa, no hay tocata (1976)
 Kiss Me Killer (1977) - Freddy Carter (uncredited)
 Las desarraigadas (1977) - Sr. Riva-Medina
 El terrorista (1978) - Aranda
 Todos me llaman 'Gato''' (1980) - Ruiz (final film role)

 References 

 Bibliography 
 Mira, Alberto. The Cinema of Spain and Portugal''. Wallflower Press, 2005.

External links 
 

1922 births
1983 deaths
Argentine male film actors
Argentine emigrants to Spain
People from Rosario, Santa Fe